Orkdal Fjord is a branch of the Trondheim Fjord located in Orkland and Skaun municipalities in Trøndelag county, Norway.

The Orkdal Fjord starts between Viggja village on the southeast side of the fjord and the village of Geitastrand on the northwest side of the fjord. This is where the Korsfjorden part of the Trondheim Fjord splits into two separate branches; Gaulosen that stretches towards the southeast and the Orkdal Fjord that stretches about  towards the southwest to Orkanger and the mouth of the Orkla river at the end of the fjord.

Much of the land on either side of the fjord is quite steep and the gradient often continues into the sea with the fjord reaching depths in excess of  just a short distance from the shore in some places.

Orkanger Harbour, which also includes Thamshavn, lies at the end of the fjord. The harbour is administered by Trondheim Harbour. The main export is ferrosilicon and the main imports are coal, coke and quartz.

The European route E39 highway runs along the southeastern side of the fjord while county route 710 runs along the other side of the fjord.

References 

Trondheimsfjord
 Orkland
 Skaun